Kelbet Nurgazina (born 8 July 1986) is a Kazakhstani judoka.

She won a bronze medal in the extra-lightweight (48 kg) category of the 2006 Asian Games, having defeated Gereltuya Erdenechimeg of Mongolia in the bronze medal match.

She currently resides in Karaganda.

External links
2006 Asian Games profile

1986 births
Living people
Kazakhstani female judoka
Judoka at the 2008 Summer Olympics
Olympic judoka of Kazakhstan
Asian Games medalists in judo
Judoka at the 2006 Asian Games
Asian Games bronze medalists for Kazakhstan
Medalists at the 2006 Asian Games
21st-century Kazakhstani women